The harana is a serenade tradition in rural areas of the Philippines in which young men may formally meet single lady visitors. ln harana, the songs that are usually sung are Kundiman or dansas.

Form

Traditionally, the suitor or manliligaw will visit the house of the girl he is trying to woo, and sing by her window until she comes out to either accept or deny him. The suitor may or may not be accompanied, but usually his companions will be playing a guitar or provide back up vocals as he sings. Ideally, the dalaga or young lass will choose to accept him.

History

The harana first gained popularity in the early part of the Spanish Philippines period. Its influence comes from folk Music of Spain and the mariachi sounds of Mexico. It is a traditional form of courtship music in which a man woos a woman by singing underneath her window at night. It is widely practiced in many parts of the Philippines with a set of protocols, a code of conduct, and a specific style of music. Harana itself uses mainly Hispanic protocols in music, although its origins lie in the old pre-colonial Philippine musical styles which is still practiced around the country (See also Kapanirong style of the Maguindanao people of Mindanao). The main instrument used for harana is the guitar, played by the courter, although other string instruments such as the Ukulele and less frequently, the violin and trumpets are also used.

The word harana has derived from the Spanish string instrument Jarana. It resembles a guitar, but is smaller in nature.

References

Philippine traditions
Serenades
Philippine music